A. J. Ryan (May 20, 1927 – April 30, 2006) was an American politician. He served as a Democratic member of the Florida House of Representatives. He also served as a member for the 30th district of the Florida Senate.

Life and career 
Ryan was born in Dania Beach, Florida. He attended South Broward High School and the University of Florida.

In 1956, Ryan was elected to the Florida House of Representatives, serving until 1962. In the same year, he was elected to represent the 30th district of the Florida Senate, serving until 1967.

Ryan died in April 2006, at the age of 78.

References 

1927 births
2006 deaths
People from Dania Beach, Florida
Democratic Party Florida state senators
Democratic Party members of the Florida House of Representatives
20th-century American politicians
University of Florida alumni